Sõrve Peninsula is a peninsula which forms the southernmost section of the Estonian island Saaremaa. Its length is 32 km, and its maximum width 10 km. South of it lies Irbe Strait, the main entrance to the Gulf of Riga of the Baltic Sea.

Historically, the peninsula had considerable military significance, dominating the Irbe Strait and the sea route to Riga. In the first half of the 20th century strong coastal batteries were installed on it by Imperial Russia up to 1917 and then by the Soviet Union after 1940. In the course of World War II, the peninsula saw major fighting between Soviet and German forces, first in 1941 with the Germans attacking and the Soviets defending, and again during the Moonsund Landing Operation in 1944 with the roles reversed.

Even now it is dangerous to walk in undeveloped forest areas because much unexploded ordnance remains from the fighting.

The Sõrve peninsula is also known for its unique and special natural attractions. Many rare species of birds, flowers and insects can be found throughout Sõrve.

About 400 people live there throughout the year, but most are retired. Before the war, Sõrve was the most densely inhabited rural area in Estonia.

Since 1947, Estonian expatriate organisations in Australia have run an annual youth summer camp called "Sõrve", named after Sõrve peninsula.

Climate

Lighthouse 

The current lighthouse on Sõrve säär ("tip of Sõrve", known for its shingle beach), a cylindrical concrete tower, was built in 1960 to replace a square stone lighthouse built in 1770 and subsequently destroyed during the fighting between the Russians and the Germans in 1944 during World War II. In 1945 a temporary wooden lighthouse was built to serve during the period between two permanent lighthouses.

References

Sources

Baltic Sea
Saaremaa
Peninsulas of Estonia
Landforms of Saare County